Muhammad Salman Alfarid (born 16 April 2002) is an Indonesian professional footballer who plays as a left-back for Liga 1 club Persebaya Surabaya.

Club career

Persija Jakarta
He was signed for Persija Jakarta to play in Liga 1 in the 2020 season. Alfarid made his first-team debut on 19 September 2021 in a match against Persipura Jayapura at the Indomilk Arena, Tangerang.

Persebaya Surabaya
April 2022, he joined Persebaya Surabaya with undisclosed fee. Salman made his professional debut on 16 December 2022 in a match against Persija Jakarta at the Maguwoharjo Stadium, Sleman.

International career
In November 2019, Alfarid was named as Indonesia U-20 All Stars squad, to play in U-20 International Cup held in Bali.

Career statistics

Club

Notes

Honours

International 
Indonesia U-16
 JENESYS Japan-ASEAN U-16 Youth Football Tournament: 2017
 AFF U-16 Youth Championship: 2018
Indonesia U-19
 AFF U-19 Youth Championship third place: 2019

Club 
 Persija Jakarta
 Menpora Cup: 2021

References

External links
 Salman Alfarid at Soccerway
 Salman Alfarid at Liga Indonesia

2002 births
Living people
Indonesian footballers
Sportspeople from Jakarta
Persija Jakarta players
Persebaya Surabaya players
Liga 1 (Indonesia) players
Indonesia youth international footballers
Association football defenders